The Singapore Book Publishers Association (SBPA) was incorporated in May 1968 with 22 company members, 14 of which were of Singapore origin. As of 1 July 2016 the association has 64 members engaged in a wide range of publishing, marketing and distribution activities. These are in the areas of educational textbooks, children's books, general and trade books, academic and scholarly publications, reference materials and some electronic publications.

The main aims of the association are to encourage fair trade practices and maintain high standards of workmanship and service in the publishing business; to encourage the widest possible distribution of printed books in Singapore in particular and throughout the world in general; and to promote and protect, by all lawful means, the interests of the publishers in Singapore.

At the AGM held on 11 May 2016, the following publishers were installed as members of the Executive Committee of the Singapore Book Publishers Association for the new two-year term 2016–2018:

Members
AK Publishing Pte Ltd
Alkem Company (S) Pte Ltd
Alston Publishing House
APD Singapore
Armour Publishing
Asiapac Books (Official Website)
Art Square Creation (S) Pte Ltd
Banjo & Sons
Big Tree Edu Aids Consultancy
Bubbly Books Pte Ltd
Cannon International
Cambridge University Press
Candid Creation Publishing LLP
Casco Publications Pte Ltd
CCH Asia
Child Educational Co.
Copyright Licensing and Administration Society of Singapore Ltd (CLASS)
CSC Publishing
Editions Didier Millet
Educational Publishing House
Elsevier Asia 
Elm Tree Distributors 
English Corner International
Epigram Books
Experiences & Experiments Pte Ltd
FAN-Math Education
Hodder Education
Institute of Southeast Asian Studies
ilovereading.sg
JLB Publishing
John Wiley & Sons (Asia) 
LexisNexis
Lingzi Media 
Magazines Express 
Markono Print Media
MarketAsia Distributors
Marshall Cavendish Education
Marshall Cavendish International
McGraw-Hill Education (Asia)
Modern Montessori International 
Monsoon Books
NUS Press
Pan Asia Publishing
Pansing Distribution
Pearson Education Asia 
Preston Corporation 
Pustaka Nasional 
Rank Books
Sage Publications Asia Pacific
Scholastic Books
Select Books
September 21 Enterprise
Shing Lee Publishers 
Singapore Asia Publishers 
Singapore Academy of Law - Academy Publishing
Spicers Paper
Springer Science+Business Media
Star Publishing
Success Publishing House
Taylor & Francis Asia Pacific
Tech Publications 
Tusitala Digital Publishing
Union Book Co.
World Scientific Publishing

References

External links
Official website

Book publishing companies of Singapore